The Dominican Republic competed at the 1996 Summer Olympics in Atlanta, United States.

Results by event

Athletics
Men's 100 metres
Adalberto Méndez

Men's High Jump
Julio Luciano

Women's High Jump
 Juana Arrendel
 Qualification — 1.80m (→ did not advance)

Boxing
Men's Light Flyweight (– 48 kg)
José Pérez Reyes
 First Round — Lost to Sabin Bornei (Romania) on points (10-16)

Men's Bantamweight (– 54 kg)
John Nolasco
 First Round — Defeated Steve Naraina (Mauritius) on points (18-14)
 Second Round — Lost to Hicham Nafil (Morocco) on points (6-18)

Men's Lightweight (– 60 kg)
Miguel Mojica
 First Round — Lost to Tumentsetseg Uitumen (Mongolia), 1-7

Men's Light Heavyweight (– 81 kg)
Gabriel Hernández
 First Round — Lost to Sybrand Botes (South Africa ), 11-16

Judo
Men's Half-Lightweight
Francis Figuereo

Men's Heavyweight
José Augusto Geraldino

Women's Middleweight
Dulce Piña

Table tennis
Women's singles
Blanca Alejo

Tennis
Women's singles
Joelle Schad

Weightlifting

Wrestling
Men's Flyweight, Greco-Roman
Ulises Valentin

See also
Dominican Republic at the 1995 Pan American Games

References
Official Olympic Reports
sports-reference

Nations at the 1996 Summer Olympics
1996
Olympics